Violet Montressor Synge (b.16th May 1896, d. April 1971, Surrey) served as the Girl Guide Chief Commissioner for England. She was a recipient of the Silver Fish Award, the highest adult award in Girlguiding, awarded for outstanding service to Girlguiding combined with service to world Guiding.

Prior to her tenure as Chief Commissioner, she had served as Captain of the 1st Buckingham Palace Company, formed to allow the then Princess Elizabeth to be a Girl Guide. It met for the first time on 9 June 1937. At this meeting, Princess Elizabeth was elected Seconder of the Kingfisher Patrol with Patricia Mountbatten as her Patrol Leader. There were twenty Guides who were made up from children of members of the Royal Household and Palace employees. They met at a summerhouse in the garden. During World War II, the group went into abeyance for a short time, but was re-opened at Windsor in 1942. A Brownie Pack was also opened at the same time for Princess Margaret. It had 14 members. The 1st Buckingham Palace Company was reformed in 1959 for Princess Anne. It was active until 1963.

References

Girlguiding officials
Recipients of the Silver Fish Award
Place of birth missing